Roderick Cameron Lodge Lindsay (born December 30, 1946) is a Canadian psychologist who studies the area of psychology and law, and focuses on eyewitness memory. In 1974, he received his bachelor's degree at the University of Toronto and in 1978 he received his master's degree from the University of Alberta. Lindsay also received his Ph. D from the University of Alberta in 1982.

As a social psychologist during his graduate training, Lindsay worked in the areas of aggression and attribution. After graduation he became very interested in applying psychological research and created a research program in the psychology-law area. In this program, Lindsay investigates the factors that influence the accuracy of eyewitness identification and reports. He also looks at the belief of eyewitness testimony. In the recent years Lindsay's studies have been on identification procedures to use with children and the courtroom procedures that are used with children witnesses. He also has been looking at and developing procedures that are used by the police and the courts to obtain and evaluate eyewitness evidence.

Lindsay started his career in the world of psychology at Queen's University after graduation from 1982 to 1986 as an assistant professor. From 1986 to 1996 he spent his time as an associate professor at Queen's University. And since 1996 Lindsay has worked at Queen's University as a professor in the Department of Psychology. He also belongs to several professional associations which are the American Psychologist Association, the American Psychology-Law Society, and the Society for Applied Research in Memory and Cognition.
 
Lindsay has received many grants in his career applying psychological research to studying eyewitness memory. The grants that he has received have ranged from $16,423 all the way to $184,731. From 1983 to 1985 he received $16,423 to study eyewitness accuracy and the belief of eyewitness testimony. Between 1992 and 1995 he received $82,500 to study the issues that come from eyewitness memory. In 2002 to 2005 Lindsay studied the credibility of children's testimony with N. Bala and K. Lee and received $150,000 to conduct the research. The most recent grant that he has received was in 2004 to 2009 when he received $100,000 and worked on reducing wrongful convictions.

Lindsay has also testified as an expert on eyewitness issues in criminal cases and civil cases on three different continents. He also has consulted with individual police identification officers and departments that use re-identification procedures. In 2002, he provided training to Canadian judges on the issues with eyewitness identification. The training was developed by the National Judicial Institute and by the end of 2004, he had trained about 65% of the criminal court justices in Canada. Lindsay is a member of the Technical Working Group for Eyewitness Evidence and participated in the development and the writing of the American national guidelines for obtaining and preserving eyewitness evidence. He continues to work on developing training materials to accompany the Eyewitness Evidence: A Guide for Law Enforcement. Lindsay has also consulted in one of the United Nations war crime trails for Rwanda over genocide. He was asked by the United Nations prosecutors to consult with them when the defense called an expert witness to testify. During June and July 1998 he read e-mailed transcripts of the witness's testimony and provided the prosecutors comments and suggested questions for their cross-examination. In September 1998 he was called to testify in Arusha, Tanzania.

Publications
He has also had a lot of his work published throughout the years. Two of his books were published in 2007: Handbook of Eyewitness Psychology: Memory for People and Handbook of Eyewitness Psychology: Memory for Events. Most of his published work has been articles in referred journals. Some examples of his articles in referred journals are Eyewitness Accuracy Rates in Police Showup and Lineup Presentations: A Meta-Analytic Comparison, Eyewitness Accuracy Rates in Sequential and Simultaneous Lineup Presentations: A Meta-Analytic Comparison, Identification Accuracy of Children Versus Adults: A Meta-Analysis, and Cross-Race Facial Recognition: Failure of the Contact Hypothesis. These are just a few examples of the many articles of his that are referred to in different journals.

Research Interests and Areas of Study

Factors that Influence Eyewitness Accuracy
Lindsay has expressed interest in many areas of research dealing with eyewitness memory and has done a great deal of research in several areas to determine factors that influence eyewitness accuracy and to what extent.

Early on, Lindsay used a meta-analytic comparison to study accuracy differences between simultaneous lineup presentations and sequential lineup presentations. As the results from this study showed, the type of lineup presentation that is used affects the accuracy of eyewitness memory. The results showed that accurate identification from target-present lineups occurs much higher in a simultaneous lineup than sequential lineups. However, correct rejection rates were much higher for sequential than simultaneous lineups.

Recently, Lindsay has researched the influence that age has on the accuracy of eyewitness memory. Along with age, Lindsay has found that many factors come into play such as encoding errors, such as memory trace, as well as accuracy errors because of demand. Similarly, Pozzulo and Lindsay's studies, among many others, have found that children have little to no accuracy in making correct rejections in facial recognition studies.

Lindsay and Wei-Jen Ng found that there is no “cross-race effect” in which there is inferior facial recognition of races that the eyewitness has had a lack of contact with. Though, their study yielded a failure of the contact hypothesis, there are still some studies that show that facial recognition and race play a role in influencing eyewitness accuracy. This can be seen in a study by Steblay et al. (2003) which yielded results that false identification was much higher for police showups when an innocent suspect closely resembled the culprit.

Children’s Eyewitness Memory
Another area of interest for Lindsay includes identification procedures for use with children's eyewitness memory. The purpose of the studies conducted by Joanna D. Pozzulo and Lindsay was to examine identification accuracy of children and adults in a meta-analysis. Traditionally, children are not viewed as competent witnesses compared to adults and are often viewed as less reliable and less accurate. Pozzulo and Lindsay consider the accuracy of children's eyewitness memory and explore procedures to be used with child witnesses in the courtroom.

The findings of these studies yielded results in a variety of areas dealing with children's eyewitness testimony. First, the studies found that preschoolers (4 years of age) were less likely than adults to make correct identifications; however, with the same regards, children over the age of 5 did not considerably differ from adults.

Differing, children of all ages, including adolescents, were less likely than adults to correctly reject a target-absent lineup. The type of lineup used to test eyewitness testimony also differed in results between children and adults. A sequential lineup presentation resulted in a greater difference between children and adults for correct rejections compared to a simultaneous lineup presentation.

Along with the studies examining child and adult differences in identification accuracy, Puzzulo and Lindsay also explored courtroom procedures that can be used with children to increase the accuracy of their eyewitness testimony. In adults, sequential lineups aid in correct rejection target-absent lineups; however, they do not help children, but actually result in fewer correct rejections made by children. Although they explored this area, the results showed that even with identification practice/training, a child witnesses’ correct rejection rates did not increase. They discussed suggestions and presented future directions for identification research.

Procedures used by Police and Courtrooms
Lindsay's, and several others’ research has contributed greatly to procedures used by police and courtrooms, including the way in which police lineups are conducted (sequential or simultaneous), strategies for choosing lineup fillers, the relationship between eyewitnesses confidence and their accuracy, etc.

Lindsay and Gary Wells developed a different lineup procedure in which culprits are presented to the eyewitness one at a time rather than simultaneously. This is known as sequential presentation. Sequential presentation was produced with the intentions of reducing the inclination of eyewitnesses to rely on relative judgment in which they decide who looks most like the culprit. In a sequential presentation lineup, eyewitnesses are forced to decide whether or not the lineup member is the perpetrator or not before viewing the next lineup member. Lindsay and Wells’ data showed that in regards to correct identification rates when the culprit was present, simultaneous and sequential procedures produced very similar rates. However, when the lineup did not contain the culprit the rate of mistaken identifications was significantly higher for the simultaneous presentation than the sequential lineup presentation.

References

1946 births
Canadian psychologists
Living people
University of Alberta alumni
Academic staff of Queen's University at Kingston